The 1894 Northwestern Purple team represented Northwestern University during the 1894 college football season. In their first and only year under head coach A. A. Ewing, the Purple compiled a 4–5 record.  Three of the victories were mid-week warm-up games against Evanston High School. In three games against major college opponents (Chicago and Illinois), the team lost by a combined total score of 148 to 0.

Schedule

References

Northwestern
Northwestern Wildcats football seasons
Northwestern Purple football